María Esther Gilio (1922 – 27 August 2011) was a Uruguayan journalist, writer, biographer, and lawyer, distinguished for her contributions to newspapers of Uruguay and Argentina. She also wrote for publications in Brazil, Mexico, Spain, France, Italy, Chile, and Venezuela.

Biography
María Esther Gilio became a lawyer in 1957 and began working as a journalist in 1966 at the weekly Marcha, subsequently joining Brecha, Revista Plural, Tiempo Argentino, La Opinión, El País, La Nación, Clarín, and Página/12.

She produced valuable interviews with relevant figures of the River Plate region and international culture, such as Jorge Luis Borges, Aníbal Troilo, Juan Carlos Onetti, Mario Vargas Llosa, Gonzalo Fonseca, José Saramago, Mario Benedetti, Vittorio Gassman, Augusto Roa Bastos, China Zorrilla, Adolfo Bioy Casares, José Donoso, Fernando Vallejo, Noam Chomsky, Abelardo Castillo, and Luis Pérez Aguirre.

She lived in exile in Paris in 1972, in Argentina from 1973 to 1976 and 1978 to 1985, and in Brazil from 1976 to 1978. In 1990 she again took up residence in Montevideo.

Her interviews were part of Onetti's biography Construcción de la noche: La vida de Juan Carlos Onetti (Buenos Aires: Planeta, 1993). In 1993 Conversaciones con María Esther Gilio was published, and in 2008 she joined the roster of Diálogos con la cultura uruguaya (published by El País).

Select publications
 La guerrilla tupamara, 1970 (Casa de las Américas Prize)
 Personas y personajes, 1973
 Diálogo con Wilson Ferreira Aldunate, 1984
 Construcción en la noche: la vida de Juan Carlos Onetti, 1993
 Terra da felicidade, 1997
 El cholo González, un cañero de Bella Unión, 2004
 Pepe Mujica: de Tupamaro a ministro, 2005
 Aurelio el fotógrafo o la pasión de vivir, 2006

References

Further reading
 Villanueva Liliana; Lloverá siempre. Las vidas de María Esther Gilio. Montevideo: Criatura, 2018

External links
 

1922 births
2011 deaths
20th-century biographers
20th-century journalists
20th-century Uruguayan lawyers
21st-century biographers
21st-century journalists
Uruguayan exiles
Uruguayan journalists
Uruguayan people of Italian descent
Women biographers
Uruguayan women journalists
Writers from Montevideo
21st-century Uruguayan women writers
20th-century Uruguayan women writers
20th-century women lawyers
Uruguayan expatriates in France
Uruguayan expatriates in Argentina
Uruguayan expatriates in Brazil